Cosmethella minor is a species of snout moth. It was described by Eugene G. Munroe and M. Shaffer in 1980 and is known from Papua New Guinea.

References

Moths described in 1980
Pyralinae